In 2007, the Campeonato Brasileiro Série C, the third division of the Brazilian League, was contested by 64 clubs, with the promotion of Bragantino, Bahia (lost Fonte Nova against Vila Nova), Vila Nova-GO, and ABC-RN, to the Campeonato Brasileiro Série B to be contested in 2008. No teams were relegated, since the fourth division in the Brazilian league was introduced only in 2009.

Competition format

First stage
The 64 teams play in 16 groups of four. Within each group, the four teams play a double round robin, i.e. they play each other in home and away matches, totalling six matchdays. The two best ranked teams in each group qualify to the Second Stage.

Second stage
The 32 teams qualified from the First Stage play in eight groups of four. Within each group, the four teams play a double round robin, i.e. they play each other in home and away matches, totalling six matchdays. The two best ranked teams in each group qualify to the Third Stage.

Third stage
The 16 teams qualified from the Second Stage play in four groups of four. Within each group, the four teams play a double round robin, i.e. they play each other in home and away matches, totalling six matchdays. The two best ranked teams in each group qualify to the Final Stage.

Final stage
The eight teams qualified from the Third Stage are put together in a single group. They play a double round robin, i.e. they play each other in home and away matches, totalling fourteen matchdays. The four best ranked teams are automatically promoted to the Série B in 2008.

Participating teams
The participating teams are sorted by state:

Stages of the competition

First stage
Group 1 (AC-AM-RO-RR)

Group 2 (AP-AM-PA)

Group 3 (MA-PA-TO)

Group 4 (CE-MA-PI)

Group 5 (CE-PB-PE-RN)

Group 6 (PB-PE-RN)

Group 7 (AL-BA-SE)

Group 8 (AL-BA-ES)

Group 9 (DF-GO-MT)

Group 10 (DF-GO-MT)

Group 11 (ES-MG-RJ-SP)

Group 12 (RJ-SP)

Group 13 (MS-SP)

Group 14 (MG-RJ-SP)

Group 15 (PR-RS-SC)

Group 16 (PR-RS-SC)

Second stage
Group 17 (AC-MA-PA)

Group 18 (AM-PA-PI)

Group 19 (BA-ES-PB)

Group 20 (AL-PE-RN-SE)

Group 21 (GO-RJ)

Group 22 (GO-SP)

Group 23 (MG-PR-RS-SP)

Group 24 (MS-MG-RS-SC)

Third stage
Group 25 (AC-AM-BA-RN)

Group 26 (AL-PA-PB-PI)

Group 27 (GO-MG-RS)

Group 28 (GO-RJ-RS-SP)

Final stage
Group 29 (BA-GO-PB-PI-RN-SP)

Champion: Bragantino
Runners-up: Bahia
Third Place: Vila Nova
Fourth Place: ABC de Natal

Note: On This Phase, The EC Bahia Lost the Fonte Nova in last game at home (25 November 2007) (2008–2014).

Bahia 0 × 0 Vila Nova:

Stadium – Estádio Octávio Mangabeira, Salvador, Bahia, Brazil

On 85 or 88 minutes, 13 people fell and 7 people died, because the collapse of the bleachers (see more in Portuguese.)

The biggest rival of Bahia promoted to first division in same year.

External links
2007 Campeonato Brasileiro Série C at RSSSF

3
Campeonato Brasileiro Série C seasons